The 1981 season was São Paulo's 52nd season since club's existence.

Statistics

Scorers

Overall

{|class="wikitable"
|-
|Games played || 89 (23 Campeonato Brasileiro, 56 Campeonato Paulista, 10 Friendly match)
|-
|Games won || 45 (13 Campeonato Brasileiro, 28 Campeonato Paulista, 4 Friendly match)
|-
|Games drawn || 22 (6 Campeonato Brasileiro, 12 Campeonato Paulista, 4 Friendly match)
|-
|Games lost || 22 (4 Campeonato Brasileiro, 16 Campeonato Paulista, 2 Friendly match)
|-
|Goals scored || 124
|-
|Goals conceded || 71
|-
|Goal difference || +53
|-
|Best result || 6–2 (H) v Palmeiras - Campeonato Paulista - 1981.10.4
|-
|Worst result || 0–3 (A) v Palmeiras - Campeonato Paulista - 1981.5.17
|-
|Top scorer || Serginho (32)
|-

Friendlies

Official competitions

Campeonato Brasileiro

Record

Campeonato Paulista

Record

External links
official website 

Association football clubs 1981 season
1981
1981 in Brazilian football